Polydontes acutangula is a species of air-breathing land snail, a terrestrial pulmonate gastropod mollusk in the family Sagdidae.

Distribution 
This species occurs in Puerto Rico.

Life cycle 
The size of the animal is about 45 mm. The size of the egg is 9.6 × 7.6 mm.

See also 
 Fauna of Puerto Rico

References

External links 
 image

Sagdidae
Gastropods described in 1815